KZIG (107.5 FM, "The Rock") is a radio station licensed to serve the community of Wapanucka, Oklahoma. The station is owned by Keystone Broadcasting Corporation and airs a classic rock format.

The station was assigned the KZIG call letters by the Federal Communications Commission on February 18, 2013.

References

External links
 Official Website
 FCC Public Inspection File for KZIG
 

ZIG
Radio stations established in 2013
2013 establishments in Oklahoma
Classic rock radio stations in the United States
Johnston County, Oklahoma